

National team

Friendly Matches

 Qatar vs. Iraq not considered as a FIFA International match since Iraq made 13 Substitutions.

Four Nations Tournament
Four nations tournament, hosted in the UAE. Two semi-finals, winners advance to the final.

2009 FIFA Confederations Cup

Group A

2009 Gulf Cup of Nations

Group A

Domestic clubs in international tournaments

2009 AFC Cup 

Iraq was excluded from the AFC Champions League due to not fulfilling the AFC demand of having a fully professional league. Hence, the Iraqi clubs relegated to the AFC Cup with having 2 seats to participate in. The 2007–08 Iraqi Premier League's Champion (Arbil FC) and runners-up (Al-Zawraa) will participate this season.

Group B

Group C

Round of 16

Quarter finals

First leg

Second leg

Final

Thaghr al-Iraq Championship
The 2009 Thagher al-Iraq Tournament or 2009 Thaghr Al Iraq Championship was a  pre-season men's football friendly tournament hosted by Branch of Basra in Iraq Football Association, between clubs of cities that located in south of Iraq; (Basra, Dhi Qar and Amarah), that play in Iraqi Premier League and that play in Iraq Division One.

The 2009 Thagher al-Iraq Tournament  took place on 14–21 December 2009  and featured Al-Mina'a, Al-Bahri, Naft Al-Junoob, Ghaz Al-Junoob, Al-Nassriya, and Naft Maysan.

The winners of the tournament were Al-Mina'a, who defeated Naft Al-Junoob in the final.

Group stage 
The first place (shaded in green) qualified to the final.

Group A

Group B

Final

References

External links
iraq-football.net/ 
iraqfc.webs.com/